Events from the year 1840 in art.

Events
 March 4 – Alexander S. Wolcott and John Johnson open their "Daguerreian Parlor" on Broadway (Manhattan), the world's first commercial photography portrait studio.
 May 1 – Issue in the United Kingdom of the Penny Black, the world's first postage stamp, depicting the head of Queen Victoria engraved by Charles Heath and his son Frederick based on a sketch provided by Henry Corbould itself based on a cameo portrait by William Wyon, together with Mulready stationery. The stamp becomes valid for postage from May 6.
 September 30 – Foundation of Nelson's Column laid in London, Trafalgar Square being laid out and paved around it during the year.

Works

 Jean-Antoine Alavoine and Joseph-Louis Duc – July Column, Place de la Bastille, Paris; incorporating Auguste Dumont's Génie de la Liberté and bas-reliefs by Antoine-Louis Barye and others
 Thomas Jones Barker – The Bride of Death
 François Bouchot – Napoleon Bonaparte in the coup d'état of 18 Brumaire in Saint-Cloud
 Théodore Chassériau
 Andromeda Chained to the Rock by the Nereids
 Diana Surprised by Actaeon
 Portrait of the Reverend Father Dominique Lacordaire, of the Order of the Predicant Friars
 Francis Danby – The Deluge
 Eugène Delacroix (Musée du Louvre, Paris)
 Entry of the Crusaders in Constantinople
 The Shipwreck of Don Juan
 William Etty – The Wrestlers (approximate date)
 Horatio Greenough – George Washington (statue, Washington, D.C.)
 Edwin Landseer – Laying Down The Law, or Trial by Jury (Chatsworth House, England)
 Robert Scott Lauder – David Roberts Esq. in the dress he wore in Palestine
 John Martin – The Eve of the Deluge (British Royal Collection) and The Assuaging of the Waters (Fine Arts Museums of San Francisco)
 John Christian Schetky – Loss of the Royal George
 Armand Toussaint – Persephone (sculpture) (approx. date)
 J. M. W. Turner – The Slave Ship, or Slavers throwing overboard the Dead and Dying — Typhoon coming on (Museum of Fine Arts, Boston)

Awards
 Grand Prix de Rome, painting:
 Grand Prix de Rome, sculpture:
 Grand Prix de Rome, architecture: Théodore Ballu.
 Grand Prix de Rome, music: F.E.V. Bazin.

Births
 February 7 – Ida Göthilda Nilsson, Swedish sculptor (died 1920)
 April 22 – Odilon Redon, French painter and graphic artist (died 1916)
 April 28 – Caroline Shawk Brooks, American sculptor (died 1913)
 May 2 – Philippe Solari, Provençal sculptor (died 1906)
 May 28 – Hans Makart, Austrian painter and designer (died 1884)
 July 8 – Heinrich von Angeli, Austrian society portrait painter (died 1925)
 August 14 – Briton Rivière, English painter (died 1920)
 September 27 – Thomas Nast, German American cartoonist (died 1902)
 November 12 – Auguste Rodin, French sculptor (died 1917)
 November 14 – Claude Monet, French Impressionist painter (died 1926)
 December 1 – Marie Bracquemond, née Quivoron, French Impressionist painter (died 1916)
 probable – Timothy H. O'Sullivan, Irish American photographer of the American Civil War (died 1882)

Deaths
 January 16 – František Tkadlík, Czech painter (born 1786)
 February 9 – Luke Clennell, English engraver and painter (born 1781)
 February 27 – Henry Wyatt, English portrait painter (born 1794)
 March 19 – Thomas Daniell, landscape painter (born 1749)
 March 30 – Beau Brummell, leader of fashion (born 1778)
 April 7 – William Heath, English satirical engraver (born 1794)
 April 10 – Alexander Nasmyth, painter (born 1758)
 May 5 – Robert Trewick Bone English painter of sacred, classical and genre scenes (born 1790)
 May 7 – Caspar David Friedrich, painter (born 1774)
 May 11 – Eduard Joseph d'Alton, German engraver and naturalist (born 1772)
 June 20 – Pierre-Joseph Redouté, flower painter (born 1759)
 July 6 – Johann Heinrich Ramberg, German painter and printmaker (born 1763)
 July 23 – Carl Blechen, German painter, specializing in fantastic landscapes with demons and grotesque figures (born 1798)
 August 30 - Jonas Damelis, Lithuanian neoclassicist painter (born 1780)
 October 28 – Reverend John Thomson, minister of Duddingston Kirk near Edinburgh, and landscape painter (born 1778)
 November 7 – Pierre Petitot, French sculptor (born 1760)
 December 11 – Franz Bauer, Austrian microscopist and botanical artist (born 1758)
 date unknown
 Moritz Fuerst, American engraver and medallist (born 1782)
 Luigi Rados, Italian engraver (born 1773)

References

 
Years of the 19th century in art
1840s in art